Alessandro Palma di Cesnola (1839–1914) was an American diplomat who conducted excavations in Cyprus. He worked at Paphos, where he was U.S. vice-consul, and Salamis on behalf of the British government. The results of these are described in Salaminia (1882). In 1878, Cesnola was arrested for conducting an illegal investigation in Cyprus. Alessandro was the brother of the better known excavator Luigi Palma Di Cesnola.

Publications 
Cesnola, A. P. (1884). Salaminia (Cyprus): The History, Treasures, & Antiquities of Salamis in the Island of Cyprus. Whiting and Company.

References

External links
The terracottas & pottery of the Cesnola collection of Cypriote antiquities
Antiquities from Cyprus. Photograph album by A.P. di Cesnola, 1881.

1839 births
1914 deaths
Archaeology of Cyprus
People from Rivarolo Canavese